Vladimir "Vlado" Kalember (born 26 April 1953) is a Croatian pop singer, famous for his recognisable, husky voice. 

In the 1970s, he was the vocalist of the popular pop band, Srebrna Krila. After leaving the band, he continued with a solo career. In 1984, together with Izolda Barudžija, he represented Yugoslavia at the Eurovision Song Contest. He was later a member of 4 Asa.

Today, he is married to a young cello instrumentalist, Ana Rucner, and has a child with her. His famous songs are "Vino na usnama", "Ja nisam kockar", "Ana", "Lili", "Otkad si otišla", "Ja odavde, ona s juga", "Odoh u mornare", "Doris" and many other.

See also 
 Music of Croatia
 Srebrna Krila

References

1953 births
People from Strumica
Living people
20th-century Croatian male singers
Croatian pop singers
Croatian people of Macedonian descent
Yugoslav musicians
Eurovision Song Contest entrants of 1984
Eurovision Song Contest entrants for Yugoslavia